The 1992–93 Segunda Divisão season was the 59th season of the competition and the 43rd season of recognised third-tier football in Portugal.

Overview
The league was contested by 53 teams in 3 divisions with Académico Viseu, Leça FC and Portimonense SC winning the respective divisional competitions and gaining promotion to the Liga de Honra.  The overall championship was won by Leça FC.

League standings

Segunda Divisão - Zona Norte

Segunda Divisão - Zona Centro

Segunda Divisão - Zona Sul

Footnotes

External links
 Portuguese Division Two «B» - footballzz.co.uk

Portuguese Third Division seasons
Port
3